This is a list of relational database management systems.

List of software

4th Dimension
Access Database Engine (formerly known as Jet Database Engine)
Adabas D
Airtable
Apache Derby
Apache Ignite
Aster Data
Amazon Aurora
Altibase
CA Datacom
CA IDMS
Clarion
ClickHouse
Clustrix
CockroachDB
CSQL
CUBRID
DataEase
DataFlex
Database Management Library
Dataphor
dBase
Derby (aka Java DB)
Empress Embedded Database
Exasol
Extensible Storage Engine
EnterpriseDB
eXtremeDB
FileMaker Pro
Firebird
FoundationDB
FrontBase
Greenplum
GroveSite
H2
Helix
HSQLDB
IBM Db2
IBM Lotus Approach
Infobright
Informix
Ingres
InterBase
InterSystems Caché
InterSystems IRIS Data Platform
Linter
MariaDB
MaxDB
Microsoft SQL Server
Microsoft SQL Server Express
SQL Azure (Cloud SQL Server)
Microsoft Visual FoxPro
Mimer SQL
MonetDB
mSQL
MySQL
Netezza
NexusDB
NonStop SQL
NuoDB
Omnis Studio
OpenLink Virtuoso (Open Source Edition)
OpenLink Virtuoso Universal Server
Oracle
Oracle Rdb for OpenVMS
Panorama
Paradox
Percona Server for MySQL
Percona XtraDB Cluster
Pervasive PSQL
Polyhedra
PostgreSQL
Postgres Plus Advanced Server
Progress Software
Raima Database Manager (RDM)
RDM Server
R:Base
RethinkDB
SAND CDBMS
SAP HANA
SAP Adaptive Server Enterprise
SAP IQ (formerly known as Sybase IQ)
SingleStore
Snowflake Cloud Data Warehouse
solidDB
SQL Anywhere (formerly known as Sybase Adaptive Server Anywhere and Watcom SQL)
SQLBase
SQLite
SQream DB
SAP Advantage Database Server (formerly known as Sybase Advantage Database Server)
Teradata
TiDB
TimesTen
Trafodion
Unisys RDMS 2200
UniData
UniVerse
Vectorwise
Vertica
VoltDB
YugabyteDB

Front-end User interfaces Only
Apache OpenOffice Base
HSQLDB
LibreOffice Base
Firebird
HSQLDB
Microsoft Access
Access Database Engine

Discontinued
 Britton Lee IDMs
 Cornerstone
 DM/BasisPlus
 Google Fusion Tables
 IBM Business System 12
 IBM System R
 MICRO Relational Database Management System
 Pick
 PRTV
 QBE
 IBM SQL/DS
 Sybase SQL Server

Front-end User interfaces Only
 OpenOffice.org Base
 HSQLDB
 StarBase
 Adabas D

Relational by the Date–Darwen–Pascal Model

Current
 Alphora Dataphor (a proprietary virtual, federated DBMS and RAD MS .Net IDE).
 Rel (free Java implementation).

Obsolete
 IBM Business System 12
 IBM IS1
 IBM PRTV (ISBL)
 Multics Relational Data Store

See also
 Comparison of object–relational database management systems
 Comparison of relational database management systems
 Comparison of database administration tools

Relational Database Management Systems
Relational database management systems